James Robinson Jr. is the name of:

 James E. Robinson Jr. (1918–1945), United States Army officer and Medal of Honor recipient in World War II
 James W. Robinson Jr. (1940–1966), United States Army soldier and Medal of Honor recipient in the Vietnam War
 James Robinson (runner) (James J. Robinson Jr., born 1954), American middle-distance runner

See also
James Robinson (disambiguation)